Middle Ramu District is a district in the south-west of Madang Province in Papua New Guinea. It is one of the six administrative districts that make up the province.

See also
Middle Ramu languages

References
 Madang Provincial Economic Profile

Districts of Papua New Guinea